Johann Sebastian Bach composed the church cantata  (Settle account! Word of thunder), 168 in Leipzig for the ninth Sunday after Trinity and first performed it on 29 July 1725.

Bach set a text by Salomo Franck, a librettist with whom he had worked in Weimar. The text, which Franck had published in 1715, uses the prescribed reading from the Gospel of Luke, the parable of the Unjust Steward, as a starting point for thoughts about the debt of sin and its "payment", using monetary terms. He concluded the text with a stanza from Bartholomäus Ringwaldt's hymn "". Bach structured the cantata in six movements and scored it intimately, as he did for many of Franck's works, for four vocal parts, combined only in the chorale, two oboes d'amore, strings and basso continuo.

History and words 

The libretto is by Salomon Franck who was a court poet in Weimar. Bach had often set Franck's texts when he was Konzertmeister (concertmaster) there from 1714 to 1717.

The prescribed readings for the Sunday were from the Epistle to the Romans, a warning of false gods and consolation in temptation, and from the Gospel of Luke, the parable of the Unjust Steward.
Franck's text is closely related to the Gospel, beginning with a paraphrase of verse 2 in the opening aria. Franck uses explicit monetary terms to speak about the debt, such as "" (capital and interest). A turning point is reached in the fourth movement, referring to the death of Jesus which "crossed out the debt". The cantata is concluded by the eighth stanza of Bartholomäus Ringwaldt's hymn "" (1588). Bach had treated the complete chorale a year before in his chorale cantata Herr Jesu Christ, du höchstes Gut, BWV 113, for the eleventh Sunday after Trinity.

Bach first performed the cantata on 29 July 1725.

Music

Structure and scoring 
Bach structured the cantata in six movements and scored it intimately, as he did for many of Franck's works. The singers consist of four vocal soloists (soprano (S), alto (A), tenor (T), and bass) (B) plus a four-part choir only in the chorale. The instrumental parts are for two oboes d'amore (Oa), two violins (Vl), viola (Va) and basso continuo (Bc). The title of the autograph score reads: "9 post Trinit. / Thue Rechnung! Donner Wort / a / 4 Voci / 2 Hautb. d'Amour / 2 Violini / Viola / e / Continuo / di / J.S.Bach". The duration is given as 17 minutes.

In the following table of the movements, the scoring and keys and time signatures are taken from Alfred Dürr, using the symbol for common time (4/4). The instruments are shown separately for winds and strings, while the continuo, playing throughout, is not shown.

Movements

1 
The work opens with a bass aria, accompanied by the strings, "" (Settle account! Word of thunder). Christoph Wolff notes:

2 
The recitative, "" (It is only an alien good) is the first movement with the full orchestra. The oboes first play long chords, but finally illustrate the text figuratively, speaking of toppling mountains and "the flash of His countenance". The musicologist Julian Mincham notes that Bach's recitative is "both melodic and dramatic throughout", showing his familiarity with "the best contemporary operatic styles".

3 
A tenor aria with the oboes in unison develops "" (Capital and interest). Klaus Hofmann calls the movement dance-like.

4 
A secco recitative for bass demands: "" (Nevertheless, terrified heart, live and do not despair!).

5 
A duet of the upper voices, only accompanied by the continuo, reflects "" (Heart, rend the chains of Mammon). Hofmann notes the dotted rhythm of the dance Canarie to the often canonic imitation of the voices. The word "zerreiß" (tear asunder) is depicted by a rest afterwards. The fetters (Kette) are illustrated with "slurred coloraturas", the term "Sterbebett" (deathbed) appears in "darkening of the harmony."

6 
The closing chorale, "" (Strengthen me with Your joyful Spirit), is a four-part setting.

Recordings 
The listing is taken from the selection on the Bach Cantatas Website. Ensembles playing period instruments in historically informed performance are marked by green background.

References

External links 
 
 Tue Rechnung! Donnerwort BWV 168; BC A 116 / Sacred cantata (9th Sunday after Trinity) Bach Digital
 BWV 168 Tue Rechnung! Donnerwort English translation, University of Vermont
 Luke Dahn: BWV 168.6 bach-chorales.com

Church cantatas by Johann Sebastian Bach
1725 compositions